The FA Premier League Asia Cup 2005 was the second edition of the Premier League Asia Trophy, a four-team football (soccer) tournament held every two years. The second edition was competed by Thailand national football team, Bolton Wanderers, Everton and Manchester City at the 49,749-capacity Rajamangala Stadium. The semi-finals took place on 20 July and both third-place play-off and final on 26 July 2005.

Both semifinals were decided on spot kicks with the scores levelled on 1–1 at full-time. Thailand defeated Everton 5–3 while Bolton Wanderers edged Manchester City 5–4 on the spot-kicks.

The third place play-off was also decided via spot-kicks after a 1–1 stalemate. Manchester City beat Everton 4–2 on spot-kicks. The final was won through a penalty converted by Diouf on the 79th minute as Bolton Wanderers clinched the title with a slim 1–0 win over Thailand.

Competition format
The competition used a knock-out format. On 20 July 2005, Thailand played Everton while Bolton played Man. City. The winners competed in the final while the losers competed for 3rd place play-off, both on 23 July 2005.

Results

Semi-finals

Third place play-off

Final

Goalscorers

1 goal
 Pichitphong Choeichiu 
 Marcus Bent
 Joey Barton
 Kevin Davies
 Andrew Cole
 James Beattie
 El Hadji Diouf

External links
FA Premier League Asia Trophy 2005 (Toffeeweb.com)
FA Premier League Asia Trophy 2005 (Goalzz.com)

Premier League Asia Trophy
2005
Asia
Prem